Zarrineh Rud-e Shomali Rural District is in the Central District of Miandoab County, West Azerbaijan province, Iran. At the National Census of 2006, its population was 20,085 in 4,687 households. There were 22,052 inhabitants in 6,111 households at the following census of 2011. At the most recent census of 2016, the population of the rural district was 24,264 in 6,952 households. The largest of its 14 villages was Mamahdel, with 3,821 people.

References 

Miandoab County

Rural Districts of West Azerbaijan Province

Populated places in West Azerbaijan Province

Populated places in Miandoab County